Dalian World Trade Center is a 50-floor 242 meter (794 foot) tall skyscraper completed in 2000 located in Dalian, China.

See also
 List of tallest buildings in the world

External links

Skyscrapers in Dalian
Office buildings completed in 2000
2000 establishments in China
Skyscraper office buildings in China